Events in the year 1838 in Brazil.

Incumbents
 Monarch – Pedro II

Events
December - outbreak of the Balaiada

Births
January 13 - André Rebouças, military engineer, abolitionist and inventor
March 18 - França Júnior, playwright, journalist and painter

Deaths

References

 
1830s in Brazil
Years of the 19th century in Brazil
Brazil
Brazil